The Seebensee is a natural high mountain lake (an ice-age affected, rock basin lake) at a height of 1,657 metres, south of Ehrwald in the Mieming Range. It is surrounded by the Vorderer Tajakopf in the east,  the Vorderer Drachenkopf in the south and the Ehrwalder Sonnenspitze in the west.

The Seebensee has no significant above-ground inflows and one outflow via the Seebenbach Falls and the Geißbach into the Loisach river. The lake may be reached from Ehrwald on a forest track via the Ehrwalder Alm, via the Seeben Klettersteig, a difficult  klettersteig, or via one of the two protected mountain trails Hoher Gang or Immensteig. From Biberwier, the lake may be reached via the arête of the Biberwierer Scharte, and from Leutasch through the Gaistal valley.

Near the lake (to the northeast) lies the managed alpine pasture of Seebenalm. To the south on a rock terrace above the lake is the Coburger Hut owned by the German Alpine Club.

The surface of the lake covers around 6.5 hectares, but it used to be larger. As a result of soil and vegetation analyses it has been deduced that there was a large area southeast of the lake which used to be part of it (today easily visible, especially from above, as a mainly grassy plain) but which has now silted up.

Gallery

References

Literature and maps 
 Tirol. Kompass Digital-map (No. K 4292, 1 DVD ROM). Kompass-Karten-GmbH, Rum/Innsbruck, 2007, .
 Alpine Club map 1:25,000 scale, Sheet 4/2, Wetterstein- und Mieminger Gebirge, .
 Helmut Pflanzelt: Wettersteingebirge. Ein Führer für Täler, Hütten und Berge. Included work: Siegfried Aeberli: Mieminger Kette. 2nd edn., reviewed and enhanced by the publisher. Alpine Club Guide, Series: Nördliche Kalkalpen. Rother, Munich, 1978, .
 .

LSeebensee

Lakes of Tyrol (state)
Mieming Range